Onagrodes barbarula is a moth in the family Geometridae. It is found on New Ireland.

The wingspan is about 24 mm.

References

Moths described in 1958
Eupitheciini